Chico Buarque, occasionally referred to as Samambaia, is a 1978 album recorded by the Brazilian singer and composer Chico Buarque. The album includes hits such as "Cálice", "Pedaço de mim" and "Apesar de você", and features participations by several outstanding Brazilian artists, e.g. Milton Nascimento, Elba Ramalho, Marieta Severo and Zizi Possi..  This LP is the subject of a book in the Brazil 33 1/3 series at Bloomsbury Academic:  Charles A. Perrone, _First Chico Buarque_ (2022).

Track listing

Personnel
 Chico Buarque: vocals (except in "O meu amor") and acoustic guitar (in "Até o fim")
 MPB-4: choir (in "Cálice" and "Apesar de você")
 Quarteto em Cy: vocals (in "Apesar de você")
 Francis Hime: piano (in "Feijoada completa", "Trocando em miúdos", "O meu amor", "Pivete" and "Pequenã serenata diurna")
 Magro: piano (in "Cálice" and "Homenagem ao malandro")
 Novelli: piano (in "Até o fim"), bass (in "Pedaço de mim" and "Pequenã serenata diurna") and percussion (in "Até o fim")
 Milton Nascimento: piano (in "Pedaço de mim")
 Manoel da Conceição (Mão de vaca): acoustic guitar (in "Feijoada completa")
 Neco (Daudeth Azevedo): 7-string acoustic guitar (in "Feijoada completa")
 Miltinho: acoustic guitar (in "Cálice", "Homenagem ao malandro" and "Apesar de você")
 Arthur Verocai: acoustic guitar (in "O meu amor")
 Jorge Lima: acoustic guitar (in "O meu amor")
 Nelson Angelo: acoustic guitar (in "Até o fim" and "Pedaço de mim")
 Octávio Burnier Bonfá: acoustic guitar (in "Pivete")
 Luiz Cláudio Ramos: guitar (in "Cálice", "Pequeña serenata diurna" and "Tanto mar") and viola (in "Tanto mar")
 Bebeto (Adalberto José Castilho e Souza): bass (in "Cálice", "Homenagem ao malandro and "Apesar de você")
 Luizão Maia: bass (in "O meu amor" and "Pivete")
 Beto Guedes: bass (in "Até o fim") and mandolin (in "Pedaço de mim")
 Jorginho da Flauta (Jorge Ferreira da Silva): flute (in "Feijoada completa" and "Trocando em miúdos") and saxophone alto (in "Homenagem ao malandro")
 Celso Woltzenlogel: flute (in "Trocando em miúdos", "O meu amor" and "Pivete")
 Copinha (Nicolino Cópia): flute (in "O meu amor")
 Franklin Corrêa da Silva (Franklin da Flauta): flute (in "O meu amor" and "Tanto mar")
 Márcio Montarroyos: trumpet (in "Feijoada completa", "O meu amor" and "Pivete")
 Formiga (José Pinto): trumpet (in "Pivete")
 Netinho: clarinet (in "Feijoada completa") and saxophone soprano (in "Pequenã serenata diurna")
 Jayme Araújo: clarinet (in "O meu amor" and "Pivete")
 Marko Rupe: clarinet (in "O meu amor" and "Homenagem ao malandro")
 Raul de Barros: trombone (in "Feijoada completa")
 Edmundo Maciel: trombone (in "O meu amor", "Homenagem ao malandro" and "Pivete")
 Jessé Sadoc do Nascimento: trombone (in "Pivete")
 João Luiz Macial: trombone (in "Pivete")
 Bijú (Moacir M. dos Santos): saxophone tenor (in "Homenagem ao malandro")
 Mário Negrão: drums (in "Cálice", "Homenagem ao malandro" and "Apesar de você")
 Pedrinho: drums (in "O meu amor" and "Pivete")
 Chico Batera: drums (in "Até o fim") and percussion (in "O meu amor", "Até o fim" and "Pivete")
 Enéas Costa: drums (in "Pequenã serenata diurna")
 Ricardo Costa: drums (in "Tanto mar")
 Alceu Maia: cavaquinho (in "Feijoada completa")
 Doutor: repenique (in "Feijoada completa")
 Elizeu Felix: tambourine (in "Feijoada completa")
 Luna: tambourine (in "Feijoada completa")
 Marçal (Nilton Delfino Marçal): tambourine (in "Feijoada completa")
 Esdras Ferreira (Nenen): cuíca (in "Feijoada completa" and "Apesar de você")
 Geraldo: whistle (in "Feijoada completa")
 Gordinho (Antenor Marques Filho): surdo (in "Feijoada completa" and "Apesar de você")
 Wilson Canegal: ganzá (in "Feijoada completa")
 Wilson das Neves: snare drum (in "Feijoada completa") and agogô (in "Feijoada completa")
 Armando Marçal (Marçalzinho): tambourine (in "Apesar de você")
 Elias Ferreira: pandeiro (in "Homenagem ao malandro" and "Apesar de você")
 Djalma Corrêa: percussion (in "O meu amor" and "Pivete")
 Dom Chacal: percussion (in "O meu amor" and "Pivete")

Special guests:

 Milton Nascimento: vocals (in "Cálice")
 Elba Ramalho: vocals (in "O meu amor")
 Marieta Severo: vocals (in "O meu amor")
 Zizi Possi: vocals (in "Pedaço de mim")

References 

Charles A. Perrone, Masters of Contemporary Brazilian Song:  MPB 1965-1985.  Austin : University of Texas Press, 1989. Chapter 2.

1978 albums
Chico Buarque albums
Samba albums